Jürgen Rindler (born 10 April 1986) is an Austrian professional footballer who currently plays as a goalkeeper for Erste Liga club TSV Hartberg.

References

1986 births
Living people
Association football goalkeepers
Austrian footballers
Kapfenberger SV players